Garrett McGhin (born October 13, 1995) is an American football guard for the Arlington Renegades of the XFL. He played college football at East Carolina.

Professional career

Buffalo Bills
McGhin was signed by the Buffalo Bills as an undrafted free agent on May 13, 2019. He was placed on injured reserve on August 20, 2019, and later released on August 24.

Carolina Panthers
On November 12, 2019, McGhin was signed to the Carolina Panthers practice squad. He was promoted to the active roster on November 25, 2019. He played in two games before being placed on injured reserve on December 19, 2019. He was waived on March 18, 2020.

Buffalo Bills (second stint)
McGhin signed with the Buffalo Bills on April 23, 2020. He was waived on July 27, 2020.

Jacksonville Jaguars
McGhin was claimed off of waivers by the Jacksonville Jaguars on July 28, 2020. He was waived on September 5, 2020. He was re-signed to their practice squad on November 9, 2020. He signed a reserve/future contract on January 4, 2021. He was waived on August 25, 2021.

New Jersey Generals
McGhin was selected in the 5th round of the 2022 USFL Draft by the New Jersey Generals. He was ruled inactive for the team's game against the Pittsburgh Maulers on May 7, 2022. He was transferred back to the active roster on May 12.

New York Giants
On July 27, 2022, McGhin signed with the New York Giants. He was waived on August 30, 2022 and signed to the practice squad the next day. On September 1, 2022, he was released.

Arlington Renegades 
On November 17, 2022, McGhin was drafted by the Arlington Renegades of the XFL.

References

External links
East Carolina Pirates bio

1995 births
Living people
American football offensive tackles
East Carolina Pirates football players
Buffalo Bills players
Carolina Panthers players
Players of American football from Tallahassee, Florida
Jacksonville Jaguars players
New Jersey Generals (2022) players
New York Giants players
Arlington Renegades players